South Bend is the fourth largest city in the U.S. state of Indiana.

South Bend may also refer to:

Places
 South Bend Township, Barton County, Kansas
 South Bend Township, Blue Earth County, Minnesota
 South Bend, Nebraska
 South Bend, Pennsylvania
 South Bend Township, Armstrong County, Pennsylvania
 South Bend, Texas
 South Bend, Washington
 South Bend International Airport, Indiana

Companies
 South Bend Watch Company
 South Bend Lathe Works

See also
 South Bend station (disambiguation), stations of the name
 South Bend Blue Sox, a former women's professional baseball team
 South Bend Cubs, a U.S. Class A minor league baseball team